The attorney general of Minnesota is a constitutional officer in the executive branch of the U.S. State of Minnesota. Thirty individuals have held the office of Attorney General since statehood. The incumbent is Keith Ellison, a DFLer.

Election and term of office
The attorney general is elected by the people on Election Day in November, and takes office on the first Monday of the next January. There is no limit to the number of terms an attorney general may hold. To be elected attorney general, a person must be qualified voter, permanently resident in the state of Minnesota at least 30 days prior to the election, and at least 21 years of age.

In the event of a vacancy in the office of the attorney general, the Governor may appoint a successor to serve the balance of the term. The attorney general may also be recalled by the voters or removed from office through an impeachment trial.

Powers and duties
The attorney general is the chief law officer for the state of Minnesota, and as such, represents the state of Minnesota parens patriae in both state and federal court as well as in administrative proceedings, such as matters of adjudication or rulemaking. In addition, the Office of the Attorney General handles felony criminal appeals, issues formal opinions on questions of constitutional or statutory law, and provides legal advice, litigation, and appellate services to over 100 state agencies, boards, and commissions. On occasion, these services are extended to rural county prosecutors in serious felonies and criminal prosecutions. Separately, the attorney general's office enforces state antitrust and consumer protection laws, regulates charities, and advocates for residents and small businesses in utility matters.

In addition to his or her functional responsibilities, the attorney general is an ex officio member of the Board of Pardons, the Executive Council, the Land Exchange Board, the Governing Board for the Minnesota Historical Society, the Records Disposition Panel, and the State Board of Investment.

List of attorneys general

Minnesota Territory

In 1886, elections were moved from odd years to even years. Beginning with the 1962 election, the term of the office increased from two to four years.

Parties

State of Minnesota

Minnesota Democratic–Farmer–Labor Party: On April 15, 1944, the state Democratic Party and the Minnesota Farmer–Labor Party merged and created the Minnesota Democratic–Farmer–Labor Party (DFL). It is affiliated with the national Democratic Party.

See also
University of Minnesota Law School
William Mitchell College of Law
Attorney General of South Dakota

References

External links

 Minnesota Attorney General articles at ABA Journal
 News and Commentary at FindLaw
 Minnesota Statutes at Law.Justia.com
 U.S. Supreme Court Opinions – "Cases with title containing: State of Minnesota" at FindLaw
 Minnesota State Bar Association
 Minnesota Attorney General Lori Swanson profile at National Association of Attorneys General
 Press releases at Minnesota Attorney General

Attorneys General
 
Attorney